Stephen Law  (born 1960) is an English philosopher. He is currently Director of the Certificate in Higher and Education and Director of Philosophy at The Department of Continuing Education, University of Oxford. Law was previously Reader in Philosophy and Head of Department of Philosophy at Heythrop College, University of London, until its closure in June 2018. He also edits the philosophical journal Think, which is sponsored by the Royal Institute of Philosophy and published by the Cambridge University Press. 
He is a Fellow of The Royal Society of Arts and Commerce and in 2008 became the provost of the Centre for Inquiry UK.

Life
Law was born 12 December 1960 in Cambridge, England, and attended Long Road Sixth Form College in Cambridge. However, having been "asked to leave", he began his working life as a postman. At 24 he successfully managed to persuade City University in London to accept him for the BSc in philosophy, despite his lack of A levels. There he managed to achieve a first-class honours, allowing him to move on to Trinity College, Oxford, to read for a BPhil in philosophy. He was also for three years a junior research fellow at The Queen's College, Oxford, where he obtained a doctorate in philosophy. Law lives in Oxford, England, with his wife and two daughters.

Philosophy
Law has published both a variety of academic papers and more popular, introductory books (including three children's philosophy books). Law has debated many Christian apologists and theologians. He developed the Evil God Challenge thought experiment.

Works
The Philosophy Files 1 (2000) 
The Philosophy Files 2 (2006) (formerly called The Outer Limits) 
The Outer Limits: More Mysteries from the Philosophy Files (2003) 
The Philosophy Gym (2003) 
The Xmas Files  (2003) 
The War For Children's Minds (2006) 
Philosophy (Eyewitness Companion Guides) (2007)  translated also into Hungarian (Filozófia, 2008)
The Great Philosophers (2008) 
Israel, Palestine and Terror (2008) 
Really, Really Big Questions (2009) 
A Very Short Introduction to Humanism (2011) 
Believing Bullshit: How Not to Get Sucked into an Intellectual Black Hole (2011) Prometheus Books: New York.

References

External links

1960 births
Living people
Academics of Heythrop College
Analytic philosophers
English humanists
English philosophers
English sceptics
Philosophy academics
Philosophy journal editors